Bruno Mascolo (born March 4, 1996) is an Italian professional basketball player who plays for New Basket Brindisi in the Lega Basket Serie A.

Young career 
He started his young career in the neapolitan team Basket Team Stabia and at the age of fifteen he made his debut in Serie C with Nuova Polisportiva Stabia in the 2011-12 season.

Professional career 
In 2013-14 the coach of PMS Torino, Stefano Pillastrini made him debut in Serie A2. Also in the following season he found space with the first team reaching a total of five appearances in the two seasons and contributing to the championship victory in 2015.

In August 2015 he found an agreement with Auxilium Torino with which he signed a three-year contract. He made his Serie A debut on November 1, 2015 in the final seconds of a home match against Cantù. On April 29, he movede to Agrigento until the end of the season.

National team career 
On November 10, 2021 he was called up to coach Meo Sacchetti's long list in Italy's national basketball team in view of the 2023 FIBA Basketball World Cup qualifications, becoming the first Neapolitan called up to the national team after 37 years.
Mascolo played 1 career game for Italy's national basketball team in the World Cup qualifications.

References

External links 

 Bruno Mascolo, on Legabasket.it, Lega Basket.
 Bruno Mascolo, on Basketball-reference.com, Sports Reference LLC.
 Bruno Mascolo, su archive.fiba.com, FIBA.
 Bruno Mascolo, on eurobasket.com, Eurobasket Inc.
 Bruno Mascolo, on realgm.com, RealGM LLC.
 Bruno Mascolo, on LegaPallacanestro.com, Lega Nazionale Pallacanestro.

1996 births
Living people
New Basket Brindisi players
Auxilium Pallacanestro Torino players
Mens Sana Basket players
Napoli Basket players
Fortitudo Agrigento players
Sportspeople from Naples